"Losin' Your Mind" is the first single from the self-titled debut album by American rock band Pride & Glory. A music video was produced for the song, recorded in the swamps of New Orleans.

Overview
The song's opening notes are played on a banjo, which guitarist/vocalist Zakk Wylde hoped would produce a contrast making the guitar part sound heavier. "I had the initial riff which lent itself well to banjo. After first trying it on acoustic, I thought, 'Let's put the banjo on there and then have the band come crushing in", he recalled.

The song was heavily influenced by the Southern rock Wylde grew up listening to. "That all comes from my love of Cream, The Allman Brothers, Skynyrd and The Marshall Tucker Band. I really love that style of music", he stated.

Track listing 

"Losin' Your Mind" (album version) - 5:33
"Losin' Your Mind" (edit) - 4:37

Personnel
Zakk Wylde - vocals, guitar, banjo
James Lomenzo - bass
Brian Tichy - drums

Charts

In popular media
 The song was featured in the series 5 episode of Beavis and Butt-Head entitled 'Walking Erect'.

References

1994 debut singles
Songs about drugs
Song recordings produced by Rick Parashar
Songs written by Zakk Wylde
Pride and Glory (band) songs
1994 songs
Geffen Records singles